Tam Isfahan S.C. is an Iranian Sport club located in Isfahan. The club is active in various sports such as football and volleyball. The most prominent success of the club's football team was placing third in Qods League in 1989, and promoting to 1993–94 Azadegan League, but they sold their licence to Zob Ahan.

References 

Football clubs in Iran
Multi-sport clubs in Iran